Shafiq Ullah is a Bangladesh Nationalist Party politician and the former Member of Parliament of Noakhali-12.

Career
Ullah was elected to parliament from Noakhali-12 as a Bangladesh Nationalist Party candidate in 1979.

References

Bangladesh Nationalist Party politicians
2nd Jatiya Sangsad members